Wouter Gortzak (22 April 1931 – 26 September 2014) was a Dutch journalist and politician. He served as an editor-in-chief of the newspaper Het Parool for seven years in the 1980s. He was a member of the House of Representatives of the Netherlands between 1998 and 2002 for the Labour Party. 

Gortzak was born in Amsterdam as a son to Henk Gortzak, a Communist Party politician. Wouter was member of the same party between 1954 and 1958, but in 1973 switched to the Labour Party. Between 1952 and 1954 he was a conscript in the Dutch Army. He was a teacher between 1954 and 1960. Around the same time he studied sociography at the University of Amsterdam, between 1956 and 1964. From 1960 he worked as a booktranslator for three years. In 1963 he became editor at the De Groene Amsterdammer. He stayed on for twelve years and then became director of the Wiardi Beckman Stichting, the think-thank aligned with the Dutch Labour Party. In 1981 he became Editor-in-chief of the newspaper Het Parool, he stayed on until 1988. At that point he started as a freelance journalist and publicist. In April 1994 he was elected to deelgemeente/borough council of Amsterdam-Zuid-Oost, his term ended four years later, in 1998. In May of the same year he was elected to the House of Representatives. In the House he also stayed for one term, until 2002. In the House he dealt with minority issues and large city policy. He died on 26 September 2014 in Amsterdam.

References

External links
  Parlement.com biography

1931 births
2014 deaths
Journalists from Amsterdam
Labour Party (Netherlands) politicians
Members of the House of Representatives (Netherlands)
Politicians from Amsterdam
University of Amsterdam alumni
Het Parool editors